Ron Wilson (born February 16) is an American comics artist known for his work on comic books starring the Marvel Comics character The Thing, including the titles Marvel Two-in-One and The Thing. Wilson spent eleven years, from 1975 to 1986, chronicling The Thing's adventures through different comic titles. He co-created the Wolfpack characters with writer Larry Hama.

Early life
Ron Wilson was born in Brooklyn, New York and grew up in the Canarsie neighborhood.

Career

Wilson entered the comics industry in the early 1970s at Marvel Comics where he produced both cover illustrations and interior artwork. He was the regular artist on Marvel Two-in-One from 1975–1978 and again from 1980–1983; while additionally working on titles such as Black Goliath, Power Man, The Hulk! and Captain Britain.

In the 1980s, after the cancellation of Marvel Two-in-One, Wilson teamed with writer John Byrne on The Thing (1983–1986). In 1983 he plotted and drew "Super Boxers" (Marvel Graphic Novel #8). He drew the entire run of Marvel's Masters of the Universe (1986–1988) and the Wolfpack limited series (1988–1989). Wilson's work also appeared in The Avengers, Captain America, Deadly Hands of Kung Fu, and What If.

In 1990, Wilson illustrated an issue of Urth 4 for Continuity Comics and then returned to Marvel to draw WCW World Championship Wrestling in 1992–1993. His work appeared regularly in Marvel Comics Presents in 1992–1994. Wilson contributed to DC Comics Milestone Media imprint providing character design work and pencilled an issue of Icon as well as the DC universe mini-series Arion the Immortal. In 2008, he provided a cover for the second issue of the pro wrestling-themed mini-series Headlocked published by Visionary Comics. As of 2012, Wilson was preparing a new creator-owned project Battle Rappers.

Bibliography

Continuity Comics
 Urth 4 #4 (1990)

DC Comics

 Arion the Immortal #1–6 (1992)  
 Blood Syndicate #14 (1994)  
 Icon #11 (1994) 
 Who's Who in the DC Universe Update 1993 #2 (Arion entry) (1993)
 Who's Who: The Definitive Directory of the DC Universe #17 (Persuader entry) (1986)

Marvel Comics

 Avengers Annual #18 (1989)  
 Captain America #383, Annual #6 (1982–1991)  
 Chamber of Chills #7 (1973)  
 Crazy Magazine #68 (1980)  
 Deadly Hands of Kung Fu #27, 29 (1976)  
 Fantastic Four #179, 181 (1977)
 Fantastic Four Roast #1 (1982)  
 Giant-Size Chillers #2 (1975) 
 Giant-Size Man-Thing #4 (1975) 
 Giant-Size Master of Kung Fu #1 (1974)  
 The Hulk! #10–15, 17–18, 20, 22 (1978–1980)
 Marvel Comics Presents #11, 21, 23, 27, 49, 52, 85, 87, 94, 97, 113–118, 128–130, 140–141, 147–148 (1989–1994)  
 Marvel Fanfare #48 (Vision backup story) (1989) 
 Marvel Graphic Novel #8 ("Super Boxers") (1984)   
 Marvel Graphic Novel: Wolfpack (1987)  
 Marvel Premiere #55 (Wonder Man) (1980)  
 Marvel Super-Heroes vol. 2 #4–5, 9, 14 (1990–1993)  
 Marvel Team-Up #47 (1976)  
 Marvel Two-in-One #12–13, 16, 18, 21–23, 25–29, 31–34, 37–41, 67–69, 71–73, 77–87, 91–94, 96–98, 100, Annual #6–7 (1975–1983)
 Master of Kung Fu #21, 28 (1974–1975) 
 Masters of the Universe #1–13 (1986–1988)  
 My Love #20 (1972)
 Official Handbook of the Marvel Universe #1–2, 4–6, 10–11, 13 (1983–1984)
 Official Handbook of the Marvel Universe Deluxe Edition #1, 6, 13, 18 (1985–1987)
 Official Handbook of the Marvel Universe Update '89 #8 (1989)  
 Power Man #21–23, 25, 37 (1974–1976)  
 Questprobe #3 (1985)  
 Savage Sword of Conan #95 (1983)  
 Solo Avengers #18–20 (Hawkeye) (1989)    
 The Spectacular Spider-Man Annual #11 (1991)  
 Tales of the Zombie #8–9 (1974–1975)    
 The Thing #1–33 (1983–1986)  
 WCW World Championship Wrestling #1–2 (1992)   
 Web of Spider-Man #82 (1991)  
 What If...? #23, 27–30, 39, 45 (1980–1984)  
 What If...? vol. 2 #1, 19, 28–29 (1989–1991)   
 Wolfpack #1–12 (1988–1989)

References

External links

Ron Wilson at Mike's Amazing World of Comics
Ron Wilson at the Unofficial Handbook of Marvel Comics Creators
 

20th-century American artists
21st-century American artists
African-American comics creators
American comics artists
American comics creators
Artists from Brooklyn
Inkpot Award winners
Living people
Marvel Comics people
People from Canarsie, Brooklyn
Year of birth missing (living people)